Berre may refer to:

Places
 Étang de Berre, a lagoon on the Mediterranean coast of France
 Berre-l'Étang, a commune in the Bouches-du-Rhône department in southern France
 Berre-les-Alpes, a commune in the Alpes-Maritimes department in southeastern France
 Berre (Aude), a coastal river in the Aude department, France
 Berre (Rhône), a tributary of the Rhône in the Drôme department, France
 Paros, called Berre during Turkish rule

People
 André Dieudonné Berre (born 1940), Gabonese politician
 Cecilia Fatou-Berre (1901–1989), African nun
 Enrico Berrè (born 1992), Italian fencer
 Inga Berre (born 1978), Norwegian mathematician
 Jacques le Berré (born 1937), French judoka
 Marcel Berré (1882–1957), Belgian fencer
 Morten Berre (born 1975), Norwegian footballer
 Nicolas le Berre (born 1976), French yachtsman
 Philippe Berre (born 1954), French confidence man